Lew Freedman (born 1951) is a sportswriter and former sports editor of the Anchorage Daily News in Alaska, and The Republic in Columbus, Indiana. He has worked on the staffs of the Chicago Tribune, Philadelphia Inquirer, Florida Times-Union, and has authored over six dozen books.

Education
Lew Freedman earned a BA in journalism from Boston University in 1973 and a master's in international communication from Alaska Pacific University in 1990.

References

1951 births
Alaska Pacific University alumni
Boston University College of Communication alumni
Chicago Tribune people
Editors of Alaska newspapers
Editors of Indiana newspapers
Living people
People from Columbus, Indiana
Sportswriters from Massachusetts
The Philadelphia Inquirer people
Writers from Anchorage, Alaska
Writers from Boston